János Balogh may refer to:

 János Nagy Balogh (1874–1919), Hungarian painter
 János Balogh (chess player) (1892–1980), Hungarian–Romanian chess master
 János Balogh (biologist) (1913–2002), Hungarian biologist
 János Balogh (footballer) (born 1982), Hungarian football goalkeeper

See also
Balogh (surname)